Jerry van Brunt Jr. (born c. 1959) is an American curler.

Van Brunt as third for Don Cooper team won the United States men's curling championship in 1983, defeating Bud Somerville in the final. His father, Jerry van Brunt Sr. was the coach of the team.

Teams

References

External links
 

Living people
American male curlers
American curling champions
Sportspeople from Colorado Springs, Colorado
Year of birth missing (living people)